Arpe may refer to:

Places 
Arpe (Wenne, Berge), a river of North Rhine-Westphalia, Germany, left tributary of the Wenne joining it at Berge (a district of Meschede)
Arpe (Wenne, Niederberndorf), a river of North Rhine-Westphalia, Germany, left tributary of the Wenne joining it at Niederberndorf (a district of Schmallenberg)
Arpe (Schmallenberg), locality in the municipality Schmallenberg in North Rhine-Westphalia, Germany

People 
Johannes Arpe (1897–1962), German actor
Oreste Arpè (1889–1977), Italian sport wrestler
Peter Friedrich Arpe (Petrus Fridericus Arpius, 1682–1740), German lawyer, historian and legal writer

See also
Arpitania
Harper (disambiguation)